Dantumadiel is a municipality in the province of Friesland in the Netherlands. Dantumadiel is a rural municipality characterized by economic activity and agriculture.

History 
The first time Dantumadiel is mentioned was in a document from 1242. At that time Dantumadiel, or Donthmadeil as it was then known, was a part of the Winninghe district, the northern part of Oostergo. The grietenij (municipality) Dantumadiel was led by a grietman (mayor) who was holding office in Rinsumageast and Dantumawâld. The Dutch Municipalities Act of 1851 (Dutch: Gemeentewet van 1851) abolished the grietenijen, which automatically became gemeenten (municipalities) headed by a mayor.

Population centres 
The Dantumadiel municipality is composed of 11 towns with a total of 19,030 inhabitants in 2014; the towns and their 2014 populations are listed in the table.

Source: Website Dantumadiel municipality

* Including Feanwâldsterwâl

Main sights 
 Damwâld (Dantumawâld and Moarrewâld) and Rinsumageast, are home to medieval churches.
The villages Broeksterwâld (Grutte Mûne and De Broekmolen) Rinsumageast and Readtsjerk are home to mills.
 The Skierstins a medieval fortified house in Feanwâlden.

Notable people 

 Maria Petronella Woesthoven (1760 in Dantumawoude – 1830) a Dutch poet
 Tjeerd Pasma (1904 in Rinsumageast – 1944) a Dutch modern pentathlete, competed at the 1928 Summer Olympics
 Piet Jongeling (1909 in Broeksterwâld – 1985) journalist, politician and children's books writer
 Theun de Vries (1907 in Feanwâlden – 2005) writer and poet
 Jannes van der Wal (1956 in Driezum – 1996) a Dutch/Frisian draughts player 
 Syb van der Ploeg (born 1966 in Dokkum) musician and composer
 Theo Pijper (born 1980 in Dokkum) a Dutch motorcycle speedway rider in the UK

Politics 
The Dantumadiel municipal government consists of a municipal council, board of aldermen and the mayor. Klaas Agricola, (Dutch Wiki) has been the mayor of Dantumadiel since December 2017.

References

External links 

 

 
Municipalities of Friesland